Greenwood is an unincorporated community in Boone County, West Virginia, United States.

References

Unincorporated communities in Boone County, West Virginia